Lunie D. Danage (June 15, 1895 – March 17, 1982) was an American baseball second baseman in the Negro leagues. He played with the St. Louis Giants in 1920.

External links
 and Seamheads

St. Louis Giants players
1895 births
1982 deaths
Baseball players from Texas
People from Pittsburg, Texas
Baseball second basemen
20th-century African-American sportspeople